In finite group theory, a mathematical discipline, the Gilman–Griess theorem, proved by , classifies the finite simple groups of characteristic 2 type with e(G) ≥ 4 that have a "standard component", which covers one of the three cases of the trichotomy theorem.

References

Theorems about finite groups